Sams or SAMS can refer to:

As an acronym
 Sadat Academy for Management Sciences
 School of Advanced Military Studies
 Scottish Association for Marine Science
 South African Mathematical Society
 South African Medical Service
 South African Military Health Service
 South American Mission Society
 Special administrative measure (SAMs)
 Surface-to-air missile (SAMs)
 Syrian American Medical Society

Companies 

 Sams Publishing

People

Born before 1950
 William Sams (1792–1871), Australian government official and entrepreneur
 Ferrol Sams (1922–2013), American physician and novelist
 Eric Sams (1926–2004), British musicologist and Shakespeare scholar
 B. J. Sams (television) (born 1935), American local television news personality
 Michael Sams (born 1941), English capital criminal
 B. B. Sams (born 1944), American artist and illustrator
 George W. Sams Jr. (born c. 1946), former field marshal of the American Black Panther Party
 Greg Sams (born 1948), American-British artist, author, inventor; creator of the veggie burger
 John B. Sams (living), American Air Force Lieutenant General and businessman

Born after 1950
 Dallas Sams (1952–2007), American politician
 Jeremy Sams (born 1957), British theatre director, composer and playwright
 Lionel Sams (born 1961), English professional darts player
 Jeffrey D. Sams (born 1964), American television actor
 B.J. Sams (American football) (born 1980), American professional football player
 Pernille Sams (born 1959), Danish real estate agent, lawyer and politician

Places 

 Sams, Colorado, a community in the United States

See also 

 Mike Sammes (1928–2001), British musician and vocal session arranger